The 2020 NCAA Men's Water Polo Championship occurred from March 18–21, 2021 in Los Angeles, California at the Uytengsu Aquatics Center. This was the 52nd NCAA Men's Water Polo Championship. Six teams participated in this championship. Although this was the 2020 championship, it was played in 2021 because of the COVID-19 pandemic. The rankings before the tournament: No. 1 Stanford, No. 2 California, No. 3 UCLA and No. 4 USC.

Schedule

Bracket
The championship featured a knockout format where schools that lost were eliminated from the tournament.

Qualification
Automatic qualifications (AQ) were awarded to six conferences. Three conferences, the Golden Coast Conference (GCC), Northeast Water Polo Conference (NWPC) and the Southern California Intercollegiate Athletic Conference (SCIAC) withdrew their automatic qualification. Participating in this year's tournament were teams from the Collegiate Water Polo Association (CWPA), Mountain Pacific Sports Federation (MPSF), and the Western Water Polo Association (WWPA). Automatic qualification teams were Bucknell (CWPA), California Baptist (WWPA), and Stanford (MPSF). At-large bids were awarded to California, UCLA and USC from MPSF.

All-NCAA Tournament
First Team
 Jake Cavano, UCLA
 Jake Ehrhardt, USC 
 Bernardo Maurizi, UCLA
 Jacob Mercep, USC
 Nicolas Saveljic, UCLA (MVP)
Second Team
 Tommy Gruwell, UCLA
 Carson Kranz, USC
 Nic Porter, USC

References

2020 in American sports
2020 in water polo
2020 in sports in California
2021 in American sports
2021 in water polo
2021 in sports in California
NCAA Men's Water Polo Championship